Vice admiral is a three-star flag officer rank in the Indian Navy. It is the second-highest active rank in the Indian Navy. Vice admiral ranks above the two-star rank of rear admiral and below the four-star rank of admiral, which is held by the Chief of the Naval Staff (CNS).

The equivalent rank in the Indian Army is lieutenant general and in the Indian Air Force is air marshal.

Officers in the rank of vice admiral hold important appointments at the naval commands and at the naval headquarters.

History
Admiral Ram Dass Katari was the first Indian to be promoted to the rank of Vice admiral. On 22 April 1958, he took over as the first Indian Chief of the Naval Staff (CNS) and promoted to the substantive rank of Vice Admiral.

From 1948 to 1968, the appointment of CNS, the professional head of the Indian Navy was held by a vice admiral. The position of the CNS was upgraded from vice admiral to admiral in 1968. The first officer to hold the rank was Admiral Adhar Kumar Chatterji who was promoted to the rank while he served as the CNS.

Naval commanders (C-in-C grade)

Senior vice admirals who are in the C-in-C grade (naval commanders), are considered to be in a grade higher than other vice admirals. They hold the senior-most appointments like the Vice Chief of the Naval Staff and the heads of the three naval commands (styled "flag officer commanding-in-chief"). The three FOC-in-C appointments are:

 Flag Officer Commanding-in-Chief Eastern Naval Command
 Flag Officer Commanding-in-Chief Southern Naval Command 
 Flag Officer Commanding-in-Chief Western Naval Command

Insignia
The flag of a vice admiral has a horizontal red stripe and a vertical red stripe intersecting at the centre. On top of the intersection is superimposed a navy-blue Ashoka Chakra with one red roundel in the upper canton next to the staff.

The badges of rank have a crossed sword and baton over three eight-pointed stars and the Ashoka emblem above, on a golden shoulder board. A vice admiral wears gorget patches which are golden patches with three white stars. Naval commanders in the C-in-C grade have additional oak leaves under the three white stars. In addition to this, the double-breasted reefer jacket has three golden sleeve stripes consisting of a broad band with two narrower bands.

Order of precedence
A vice admiral in the C-in-C grade ranks at No. 23 on the Indian order of precedence, along with lieutenant generals of the Indian Army and air marshals of the Indian Air Force in the C-in-C grade. The other vice admirals rank at No. 24 in the order of precedence.

Vice admirals in the C-in-C grade are at the apex pay scale (pay level 17), with a monthly pay of ₹225,000 (US$3,100). Other vice admirals, in the HAG+ pay scale (pay level 16) draw lesser, depending on the years in service. However, since they should not draw equivalent or more than the next higher level, the remuneration is capped at ₹224,000.

See also
 List of serving admirals of the Indian Navy
 Naval ranks and insignia of India

References

Bibliography

India Navy
Indian Navy

Military ranks of the Indian Navy
Three-star officers